Jan Grabowski (27 May 1950, Myślibórz, Poland – 13 February 2017, Zielona Góra) was a Polish speedway rider.

Biography 
From 1970 to 1980, he represented Falubaz Zielona Góra. He, with the team, twice won bronze medals at the Team Speedway Polish Championship in 1973 and 1979.

After the end of his active career, he began working as a youth coach in Zielona Góra. In 1985, he became the trainer premier of Falubaz and in the same season he won with his team the title of Team Speedway Polish Championship. Falubaz won another medal, a silver medal, coached by him in 1989.

During his coaching career, he also led, among others, ŻKS ROW Rybnik and KM Ostrów Wielkopolski from November 2010 to his death. He was the first coach of, among others, Piotr Protasiewicz, a multiple medal-winning international speedway rider.

Grabowski died in 2017, at the age of 66.

References

Bibliography 
 Wiesław Dobruszek, "Żużlowe ABC" tom I, Leszno 2004, page 168
 Jan Grabowski's Birthday
 The history of the Speedway

1950 births
2017 deaths
Polish speedway riders
People from Myślibórz